Heads of Ayr Holiday Camp railway station was a railway station serving the holiday camp and hotel at Heads of Ayr, South Ayrshire, Scotland. The station was opened by the London, Midland and Scottish Railway on the former Maidens and Dunure Light Railway.

History
The station opened on 17 May 1947, shortly before nationalisation and the formation of British Railways. It closed on 16 September 1968, along with remaining section of the former Maidens and Dunure line between the station and Alloway Junction.

References

Notes

Sources
  
 
 Article in British Railway Journal No 8 Summer 1985 Wild Swan Publications

Disused railway stations in South Ayrshire
Railway stations in Great Britain opened in 1947
Railway stations in Great Britain closed in 1968
Former London, Midland and Scottish Railway stations
Railway stations in Ayr